Athripsodes bilineatus is a species of caddisfly belonging to the family Leptoceridae.

It is native to Europe.

References

Trichoptera